Xiazhai Town  is a township-level division of Pinghe County,  Zhangzhou City, Fujian Province, China.

Tulou

Numerous Fujian Tulou, earth buildings of round, rectangular and other shapes, can be found within the administrative borders of Xiazhai Town. One of them, Xishuang Lou, located in Xi'an Village a few kilometers north of Xiazhai town center, has been described by some researchers as the "largest of the rectangular [tulou] in existence". Only parts of the compound have survived to this day.

See also
List of township-level divisions of Fujian

References

Township-level divisions of Fujian
Zhangzhou